Max Hofmeister (22 March 1913 – 12 April 2000) was an Austrian football player who competed in the 1936 Summer Olympics. He was part of the Austrian team, which won the silver medal in the football tournament. He played all four matches as midfielder.

References

External links
Max Hofmeister's profile at databaseOlympics
Max Hofmeister's profile at Sports Reference.com

1913 births
2000 deaths
Austrian footballers
Footballers at the 1936 Summer Olympics
Olympic footballers of Austria
Olympic silver medalists for Austria
Austria international footballers
Olympic medalists in football
Medalists at the 1936 Summer Olympics
Association football midfielders